Independent Macedonia sport hall is a multi-functional indoor sports arena. It is located in the municipality of Kisela Voda in Skopje.

Uses
Independent Macedonia is home to basketball team Torus that plays in the first league.

Sources

Multi-purpose stadiums in North Macedonia
Basketball venues in North Macedonia
Event venues with year of establishment missing